House of Low Culture is a musical project which is fronted by Aaron Turner, and included other members of the band Isis. The ensemble also includes Stephen O'Malley from Sunn O))) and Luke Scarola from Old Man Gloom. House of Low Culture is named after a song by Isis from their Sawblade EP.

Line-up

Current members
Aaron Turner – guitars, electronics (2000–present)
Faith Coloccia - piano, synthesizer, organ (2010-present)
Kevin Micka - zither, electronics (2020-present)

Former members
Jeff Caxide – bass
Jay Randall – electronics
Stephen O'Malley – guitars
Luke Scarola – electronics

Discography
Submarine Immersion Techniques Vol. 1 (full-length, 2000)
Gettin' Sentimental (full-length, 2002)
Edward's Lament (full-length, 2003)
Live from the House of Low Temperature! (live album, 2004)
Housing Tracts (compilation, 2010)
Poisoned Soil (full-length, 2011)
Chinatown Squalls  (full-length, 2013)
 Irretrievable (full-length, 2020)

References

Heavy metal musical groups from California
American doom metal musical groups
Utech Records artists